Koloksha is a rural locality (a settlement) and the administrative center of Kolokshanskoye Rural Settlement, Sobinsky District, Vladimir Oblast, Russia. The population was 907 as of 2010. There are 10 streets.

Geography 
Koloksha is located 19 km northeast of Sobinka (the district's administrative centre) by road. Ustye is the nearest rural locality.

References 

Rural localities in Sobinsky District